The Anishnaabeg of Naongashiing (Big Island) is a First Nation band government in Ontario. They are a member of the Anishinabeg of Kabapikotawangag Resource Council, which is a part of the Grand Council of Treaty 3. Their reserves include:

 Agency 30 (shared with 12 other First Nations)
 Big Island 31D
 Big Island 31E
 Big Island 31F
 Big Island Mainland 93
 Lake of the Woods 31B
 Lake of the Woods 31C
 Lake of the Woods 31G
 Lake of the Woods 31H
 Naongashing 31A
 Saug-a-Gaw-Sing 1
 Shoal Lake 31J

External links
 Aboriginal Affairs and Northern Development Canada profile

First Nations in Ontario
Anishinaabe peoples